Jan Doležal (born 6 June 1996) is a Czech track and field athlete who competes in the decathlon. He represented his country at the IAAF World Indoor Championships in 2018.

Born in Třebechovice pod Orebem, he competed in athletics from a young age and was the bronze medallist at the 2013 World Youth Championships in Athletics in the octathlon. He moved up to the decathlon at the 2014 World Junior Championships in Athletics, then took a gold medal in that event at the 2015 European Athletics Junior Championships. He won his first senior national title in the men's heptathlon at the 2018 Czech Indoor Championships.

International competitions

National titles
Czech Indoor Championships
Heptathlon: 2018

References

External links

1996 births
Living people
People from Třebechovice pod Orebem
Czech decathletes
Czech Athletics Championships winners
Sportspeople from the Hradec Králové Region